The GT4 America Series is a sports car racing series based in the United States. In 2019, the series was relaunched with the explicit GT4 title, following the alignment in 2017 of the Pirelli World Challenge series "GTS" class with SRO GT4, and the Stéphane Ratel Organisation assuming control of the series in May 2018.  It is a GT World Challenge America support series, managed by SRO and sanctioned by the United States Auto Club.

Classes

SprintX
In 2016 an extended sprint format series was added as a standalone championship in addition to its existing Sprint format racing series. SprintX races are 60 minutes in length and feature mandatory driver and tire changes.

For 2021 the original single-driver Sprint races (which ran alongside SprintX) were moved into the multiclass GT America series, which means all GT4 America races preserved the two-driver 60-minute format but dropped the SprintX name.

GT4 East & GT4 West
Beginning in 2019, GT4 America began two regional series integrated into its Sprint X Championship. The regional series consist of five rounds each in the eastern and western sides of North America in a two-driver, pro-am format.
Winners :

References

External links

Sports car racing series
Auto racing series in the United States
2019 establishments in the United States
GT4 (sports car class)